is a Japanese entertainment company that provides artist management services. The artists include idols, musicians, and so on.

Amuse produces TV and radio programs, commercial films, and movies. Other interests are in publication, music software, and patent agent businesses. The private Amuse Museum, located in Asakusa, Tokyo, was owned by the company. It featured ukiyo-e and textile displays.

History 

Amuse inc was created in 1978 when it signed with the rock band Southern All Stars. Soon after in 1981, Amuse inc created its movie production and distribution subsidiary Amuse Cinema City Inc. and produced Morning Moon Wa Sozatsu Ni (starring Shin Kishida) that same year, followed by Aiko 16 sai (1983). In 1983, Amuse inc signed with the actress Yasuko Tomita. The next year, Amuse inc opened its subsidiary in the United States.

Amuse Video Inc was created in 1990 as the video software production/sales subsidiary of the Amuse inc group. In 1995, Amuse created a joint-Ayers inc in a joint-venture with Bandai, and opened its first movie theater. In 2000, Amuse inc opened its Korean subsidiary. On 20 September 2001, Amuse inc was listed on the Osaka Securities Exchange. Its distributed film The Pianist won the Palme d'Or at the 2002 Cannes Film Festival.

In 2004, Amuse inc opened the internet shops Ambra. In 2007, it established its music label Taishita in joint-venture with Victor Entertainment. In 2008, the group invested in Brussels Co. Ltd., a company that develops Belgian beer bars. In 2009, the group launched its subsidiary Amuse Edutainment Inc. In 2012, Amuse Singapore was created. Amuse intended to give a second life to J-pop by promoting the bands Flumpool and WEAVER. In 2013, it produced and distributed the movie The Eternal Zero. In 2015, Amuse France inc was created.

In January 2016, Amuse established a partnership with New Japan Pro-Wrestling, an event in which Amuse inc owes shares. In the US, Amuse launched J-Creation to develop ties between the Japanese and American production powerhouses. In October 2018, Amuse USA launched Apocrypha: The Legend of Babymetal.

Notable artists 

 Masaharu Fukuyama
 Southern All Stars
 Flow
 Flumpool
 Gen Hoshino
 Dean Fujioka
 Cross Gene
 Kaori Asoh
 Jun Yoshinaga
 Junko Takeuchi
 Shit Kingz
 Yuka Itaya
 Eri Murakawa
 Juri Ueno
 Ruito Aoyagi
 Ryo Yoshizawa
 Dori Sakurada
 Shuhei Nomura
 Kento Kaku
 Shogo Sakamoto
 Shouma Kai
 Yuta Koseki
 Takuya Mizoguchi
 Takuya Terada
 Ryohei Otani
 Perfume
 Sakura Gakuin

 Babymetal
 Mafumafu
 Begin
 Porno Graffitti
 Akane Sakanoue
 Yuriko Yoshitaka
 Riisa Naka
 Kaya Kiyohara
 Ayaka Miyoshi
 Eri Fukatsu
 Frederic
 Anna Yamada
 Airi Matsui
 Alissa Yagi
 Asami Tano
 Hinata Satō
 The Oral Cigarettes
 Yuta Hiraoka
 Sakura Fujiwara
 Team Nacs
 Rie Takahashi
 Yui Mizuno
 Kenta Izuka
 Erika Yamaguchi
 IVE
 Kaori Maeda

Former artists 
 Haruma Miura
 One Ok Rock
 Takeru Satoh
 Ryunosuke Kamiki
 Kimito Totani
 Seishuu Uragami
 Shota Taguchi 
 Yu Takahashi

Other holdings

Amuse Models

Amuse Models is a division of Amuse. Amuse Models was founded in 2004, Their Kids division is sometimes called Amuse Kids.

In 2014 Amuse merged with Will Corporation and then established modeling agency that now mainly consists of teenager talent. Talents who belonged to Amuse after their merger with Will Corporation include Juri Ueno and Yuriko Yoshitaka.

See also

 Television in Japan

Notes

References

External links

Delivery Company

 
Talent agencies based in Tokyo
Entertainment companies established in 1978
Japanese companies established in 1978
Companies listed on the Tokyo Stock Exchange
Japanese talent agencies
Film production companies of Japan